Sarah Jane Tsukigawa (born  16 January 1982) is a New Zealand former cricketer who played as an all-rounder, batting right-handed and bowling right-arm medium. She appeared in 42 One Day Internationals and 19 Twenty20 Internationals for New Zealand between 2006 and 2011. She played domestic cricket for Otago, as well as spending one season with Western Australia.

Tsukigawa captained Otago Sparks in the 2006/07 State League, scoring 209 runs at an average of 34.83 and taking eleven wickets at an economy rate of 2.66.

Tsukigawa played for New Zealand A in the 2003/04 series against Australia Youth, and made her debut for the White Ferns in the 2006 series against India. She was a member of NZC's Live-In Academy in 2003. Tsukigawa was a key performer for the White Ferns in the Quadrangular Series in India in February 2007 scoring 214 runs at an average of 42.8, including her highest ODI score of 78 not out against England and her best ODI bowling figures of 3–33 against India.

Notably she jointly with Nicola Browne set the record 7th wicket partnership in the history of WODI (104*).

She is a descendant of Captain K.K.Tsukigawa, a Japanese captain of the steam boat paddle PS Clutha which plied on the Clutha river.

References

External links

1982 births
Living people
Sportspeople from Balclutha, New Zealand
New Zealand women cricketers
New Zealand women One Day International cricketers
New Zealand women Twenty20 International cricketers
Otago Sparks cricketers
Western Australia women cricketers
New Zealand people of Japanese descent